Two-time defending champion Rafael Nadal defeated Kei Nishikori in the final, 6–3, 6–2, to win the singles tennis title at the 2018 Monte-Carlo Masters. It was his record-extending 11th Monte-Carlo Masters title and his record 31st Masters title. By winning the title, Nadal also retained the ATP no. 1 singles ranking. He did not lose a single set in the entire tournament.

Seeds
The top eight seeds receive a bye into the second round.

Draw

Finals

Top half

Section 1

Section 2

Bottom half

Section 3

Section 4

Qualifying

Seeds

Qualifiers

Lucky losers

Qualifying draw

First qualifier

Second qualifier

Third qualifier

Fourth qualifier

Fifth qualifier

Sixth qualifier

Seventh qualifier

References

External links
 Main draw
 Qualifying draw

Singles
April 2018 sports events in Europe